Lakeview Hospital may refer to:

 Lakeview Hospital, Derry in northern Ireland
 Lakeview Hospital (Utah) in Bountiful, Utah, USA
 Lakeview Regional Medical Center in Saint Tammany Parish, Louisiana, USA